Aghavrin is a townland within both the civil parish and Catholic parish of Aghabullogue, County Cork, Ireland. It is 667.32 acres in size, situated south-west of Aghabullogue village, and north-west of Coachford village.

It is referred to as 'Aghrin' in the Down Survey Maps (1656-8), Aghawrinmore & Aghawrinbeg are listed as sub-denominations, and the proprietor is listed as Lord Muskry (Muskerry). The Ordnance Survey name book (c. 1840) gives an alternate Irish name of Ath a buirinn to the townland, also lists Ahavrinbeg and Ahavrinmore as sub-denominations, and describes the townland as the property of John Bowin (Bowen), Esq. of Oak Grove, and John Bowin Gumbleton, Esq. Its condition was said to be of mixed quality, principally cultivated, but containing some boggy land, rocks and furze. The townland was said to have several waterfalls to the south-west, and places included Bowing's (Bowen's) Pond, Good's Pond, Poulahourane (Waterfall), Poulanassig (Waterfall), Ahavrinmore, Ahavrieg, Ahavringrove, Ahavrin Castle (Crooke's Castle), Carrigacubbeen and Clashagorrave River. O'Donoghue (1986) holds Achadh Bhroin to mean Bron's field, and that Bron was father of Maolmuadh, king of Munster in 959, and grandfather of Cian.  O'Murchú (1991) holds upon local authority that Achadh Bhroin may refer to Byrne's or Burns' field.  The Placenames Database of Ireland gives an alternate Irish name of Achadh Bhrain to the townland.

Townlands vary greatly in size, being territorial divisions within civil parishes in Ireland. Extensively used for land surveys, censuses and polling systems since the seventeenth century, townlands have also been used as the basis for rural postal addresses. In County Cork, surveying and standardisation of townland names and boundaries by the Ordnance Survey, during the mid-nineteenth century, resulted in some earlier townland names disappearing, due to amalgamation or division. The townlands resulting from such surveys were employed during the Primary Land Valuation (Griffith's Valuation), subsequent censuses, and continue in use today.

Townland sites/items of interest
Aghavrin House
Aghavrin Cottage
Aghavrin Clapper Bridge
Aghavrin Mass Rock
Crooke's Castle, Aghavrin
St Olan's, Aghavrin
Mullinhassig Wood & Waterfalls, Aghavrin

References

External links
1841/2 surveyed OS maps (maps.osi.ie)
1901 surveyed OS map (maps.osi.ie)
acrheritage.info

Townlands of County Cork